The Dresden Suspension Railway is a suspended funicular located in Dresden, Germany, and connects the districts of Loschwitz and Oberloschwitz (Rochwitz side). It is one of the oldest suspension railways, having entered service on 6 May 1901, the same year the Wuppertal Schwebebahn entered service. Like the Wuppertal railway, this system was designed by Eugen Langen.

Overview
Despite its unusual suspended format, the Dresden Suspension Railway is operated as a conventional funicular railway. The two cars are attached to each other by a cable, which runs around a drum at the top of the incline. The ascending car is pulled up the hill by the weight of the descending car, assisted if necessary by an electric drive to the drum.

The line has the following technical parameters:

 Length: 
 Height: 
 Maximum Steepness: 39.2%
 Cars: 2
 Capacity: 40 passengers per car
 Configuration: Double suspension track (Monorail)
 Maximum speed: 
 Traction: Electricity

The Schwebebahn was not damaged in World War II, but it was out of service from 1984 to 1992 due to reconstruction. In 1990 and 2002, extensive repair works took place and there is now a new lookout point on the roof of the station.

The Schwebebahn is one of two funicular railways in Dresden, the other being the much more conventional Dresden Cable Car. Both lines are operated by the Dresdner Verkehrsbetriebe AG, who also operate the city's tram, bus and ferry networks.

See also
 List of funicular railways
 Dresden Funicular Railway since 1895

References
Specific

General

 Dresdner Verkehrsbetriebe (Hg.): Bergauf, bergab mit den Dresdner Bergbahnen. Dresden 2005
 Norbert Kuschinski: Die jüngere Schwester. 100 Jahre Schwebebahn in Dresden. in: Straßenbahnmagazin issue 5/2001, pages 68–73
 Hansjörg F. Zureck: Auf dem Balkon von Dresden. Aus der Geschichte der Bergschwebebahn in Dresden-Loschwitz. in: Straßenbahnmagazin issue 26/1977, pages 318-330

External links

 Dresden cable cars = suspension railway + funicular railway [fan page] 
 Dresden Suspension Railway page on the Dresdner Verkehrsbetriebe website 
 

Buildings and structures in Dresden
Suspended monorails
Tourist attractions in Dresden
Funicular railways in Germany
Railway lines opened in 1901
Monorails in Germany
Dresdner Verkehrsbetriebe